Ratnamala is a 1948 Telugu-language film, produced and directed by P. S. Ramakrishna Rao under the Bharani Studios banner. It stars Bhanumathi and Akkineni Nageswara Rao , with music composed by C. R. Subburaman.

Plot
Simhakethu, the ruler of Kancheepuram, is on the lookout for a suitable bridegroom for his daughter, Rathnamala. Chandrachooda, the king of Sonapura, is blessed with a son, but with a curse; to survive, before it reaches the 16th month, the child should be married to a 16-year-old girl. His minister goes on a bride hunt and reaches Kancheepuram. He shows them his own son's portrait and not that of the child prince. Rathnamala agrees to marry him. However, the minister says that, according to tradition, her marriage has to be performed with a sword. On entering the room, Rathnamala is shocked to see a child instead of the handsome youth she had seen in the portrait. The minister's son explains to her why they had to do that. She leaves the palace along with her child "husband" and goes into a forest. Unaware of all this and finding Rathnamala missing, her father imprisons Chandrachooda, his minister, and the minister's son, and then sends his men in search of his daughter. An elderly couple shelter Rathnamala in the forest.

Years pass by. The child, Chandrakanth, now seven years old, is kidnapped by a gang. Rathnamala goes in search of him. Dhoomakethu, her affectionate uncle who came in search of her locates her, and bring her back to Kancheepuram. In a fit of anger, the King, unable to get the truth from his daughter, orders her to be hanged. The minister's son reveals the truth to prove that Rathanamala is innocent. Chandrakanth lands up there. The old couple who had sheltered Rathnamala is none other than Lord Shiva and Parvathi, with whose boon Chandrakanth turns into a young man. The King performs Rathnamala's marriage with him.

Cast
 Bhanumathi as Ratnamala
 Akkineni Nageswara Rao as Chandrakanth
 Govindarajula Subba Rao as Simhakethu
 C. S. R. as Dhoomakethu				
 Suryanarayana as Chandrakanth	
 Aarani Satyanarayana	
 Nyapati Raghava Rao as Lord Siva
 Sitaram	
 Hemalatha		
 Baby Sumithra

Crew

Art: D. S. Godgaonkar
Choreography: Vedantam Raghavayya
Dialogues - Lyrics: Samudrala Sr
Playback: Ghantasala, Bhanumathi Ramakrishna, K. Jamuna Rani, C.S.R., Baby Sarojini
Music: C. R. Subburaman
Editing: V. S. Narayanan
Cinematography: P. S. Selvaraj
Presenter: Bhanumathi Ramakrishna 
Producer - Screenplay - Director: P. S. Ramakrishna Rao
Banner: Bharani Pictures
Release Date: 2 January 1948

Soundtrack

Music composed by C. R. Subburaman. Lyrics were written by Samudrala Sr.

Trivia 
The film was the debut of Bharani Pictures in the film industry and the debut movie for P. S. Ramakrishna Rao as director. Though Samudrala was credited with the lyrics, it is widely believed that some of the hit numbers were actually ghost-written by Malladi Ramakrishna Sastry.

References

External links
 Ratnamala film at IMDb.

1947 films
1940s Telugu-language films
Indian black-and-white films
Indian musical drama films
1940s musical drama films
Films directed by P. S. Ramakrishna Rao
1947 drama films
1948 drama films
1948 films
Films scored by C. R. Subbaraman